Krut is a Russian language surname. Notable people with the name include:
 Ansel Krut (1959), South African painter
 David Krut, South African publisher

References 

Russian-language surnames